The Debano massacre was a mass extrajudicial killing that took place in Debano in the Tigray Region of Ethiopia during the Tigray War, around 11 January 2021. Debano, also called Endabano, is a tabiya that belongs to  woreda  Kayeh Tehli, Central zone of Tigray.

Massacre
The Amhara Region’s armed forces killed dozens of civilians in Debano (Central Tigray) on 11 January 2021.
Debano comprises four villages, by decreasing order of importance: Sagla, Serawit, Daba Paulos, and Daba Tadios. Homesteads are scattered and population density is low. It is a hilly land with altitudes varying from 1416 to 1624 m a.s.l., on the southern banks of the  Weri’i River; there are numerous bushlands. There was fighting in Debano between ENDF and TDF; the people fled to mountains near  Weri’i River, away from the road.

Later that day, Kibrom was wounded while walking on a mine, and two of his friends were killed. Both Kibrom’s legs have been amputated.

Perpetrators
Eyewitness and victim Kibrom interpreted the identity of the perpetrators as soldiers of Amhara Region’s special forces.

Victims
The “Tigray: Atlas of the humanitarian situation” mentions approximately 30 victims.

Reactions
The “Tigray: Atlas of the humanitarian situation”, that documented this massacre received international media attention, particularly regarding its Annex A, that lists massacres in the Tigray War.

After months of denial by the Ethiopian authorities that massacres occurred in Tigray, a joint investigation by OHCHR and the Ethiopian Human Rights Commission was announced in March 2021.

References

External links
World Peace Foundation: Starving Tigray

Wars involving Eritrea
2021 massacres of the Tigray War
January 2021 crimes in Africa
2021 murders in Ethiopia